Professor Alan Burns FREng FIET FBCS FIEEE CEng is a professor in the Computer Science Department at the University of York, England. He has been at the University of York since 1990, and held the post of Head of Department from 1999 until 30 June 2006, when he was succeeded by John McDermid.

He is a member of the department's Real-Time Systems Research Group, and has authored or co-authored over 300 publications, with a large proportion of them concentrating on real-time systems and the Ada programming language. Burns has been actively involved in the creation of the Ravenscar profile, a subset of Ada's tasking model, designed to enable the analysis of real-time programs for their timing properties.

In 2006, Alan Burns was awarded the Annual Technical Achievement Award for technical achievement and leadership by the IEEE Technical Committee on Real-time Systems. In 2009, he was elected Fellow of the Royal Academy of Engineering.
He is also a Fellow of the British Computer Society (BCS) and the Institution of Engineering and Technology (IET), and a Fellow of the Institute of Electrical and Electronics Engineers (IEEE).

Books 
Alan Burns has written a number of computer science books.

References

External links 
 Alan Burns departmental home page
 Personal home page
 

Year of birth missing (living people)
Living people
Academics of the University of York
English computer scientists
Computer science writers
Fellows of the British Computer Society
Fellows of the Institution of Engineering and Technology
Fellows of the Royal Academy of Engineering
Senior Members of the IEEE